AGRP  may refer to:

Agouti-related peptide (AgRP), a metabolism-related neuropeptide
Agreement phrase (AGR ̥P), a type of phrase used in syntax